The Roman Catholic Diocese of Kundiawa is  a suffragan diocese of the Roman Catholic Archdiocese of Mount Hagen in Papua New Guinea. It was erected in 1982, having been separated from the Diocese of Goroka.

Bishops

Ordinaries
William Joseph Kurtz, S.V.D. (1982–1999), appointed Coadjutor Archbishop of Madang
Johannes Henricus J. Te Maarssen, S.V.D. (2000–2009)
Anton Bal (2009–2019), appointed Archbishop of Madang
Paul Sundu (2021–present)

Auxiliary bishop
Anton Bal (2007-2009), appointed Bishop here

External links and references

Kundiawa